Enfoiré or Enfoirés (meaning tosser(s) or bastard(s) ) may refer to:

Heuss l'Enfoiré (born 1992), French rapper of Algerian descent
Les Enfoirés, the singers and performers in the yearly French charity concert founded in 1986, with first concert held in 1989